The Parsberg is a hill in Bavaria, Germany.

Hills of Bavaria